

Buildings and structures

Buildings
 1040
 Sant Vicenç de Cardona, Catalonia is completed.
 Construction of Jumièges Abbey church in Normandy begins.
 Construction of the third Würzburg Cathedral in the Holy Roman Empire begins.
 1045 – Lingxiao Pagoda (凌霄塔) in Zhengding, China is completed.
 1048 – Rebuilding of Church of the Holy Sepulchre in Jerusalem completed.
 1049
 Saint Rémi of Reims Basilica in France is consecrated
 Iron Pagoda (鐵塔) of Bianjing, China is completed.
 Abbey Church of Ottmarsheim, Alsace is consecrated.

11th-century architecture
Architecture